Nitrobenzaldehyde may refer to any of the three isomeric chemical compounds :

 2-Nitrobenzaldehyde
 3-Nitrobenzaldehyde
 4-Nitrobenzaldehyde

Benzaldehydes
Nitrobenzenes